A160 may refer to:

Mercedes-Benz A-Class, specifically the A160 compact car
Boeing A160 Hummingbird, an Unmanned Aerial Vehicle